Elvin Aliyev may refer to:
 Elvin Aliyev (footballer, born 1984)
 Elvin Aliyev (footballer, born 2000)